HMS Pioneer was a  built for the Royal Navy during World War II. She was modified whilst under construction into an aircraft maintenance carrier. The ship arrived in Australia in mid-1945 to support operations by the British Pacific Fleet against Japanese forces. She supported the British attacks on the Japanese Home Islands from mid-June until the end of the war in August from a base in the Admiralty Islands. The ship and her facilities were used to help repair Hong Kong's infrastructure in late 1945 and she returned to the UK in early 1946. Pioneer was immediately placed in reserve upon her arrival and she was sold in 1954 for scrap.

Design, description and construction
The Colossus-class aircraft carriers were intended to meet a shortage of naval flight decks. Their design was based on that of the s, but modified to permit rapid construction in commercial yards. Pioneer was not completed to her original design; the success of the maintenance aircraft carrier  prompted modification of the ship, whilst under construction, to an aircraft maintenance ship without aircraft catapults.

She displaced  at standard load. Each of the ship's two sets of Parsons geared steam turbines drove one propeller shaft.

In order to maximize space for workshops and stores, the ship's arresting gear and catapult were not fitted; two large deckhouses were added to port of the island and on the rear of the flight deck. Aircraft were transported between the hangars and the flight deck by two aircraft lifts; each measured . Two large cranes were mounted on the flight deck to move aircraft and stores to and from the flight deck. The ship carried two small self-propelled lighters to allow unflyable aircraft to be transferred between ships or to shore facilities. The ship's crew totaled 854, plus 222 in her aircraft repair department.

The ship was equipped with six quadruple mounts for the  QF 2-pounder Mk VIII gun ("pom-pom"). These gun mounts could depress to −10° and elevate to a maximum of +80°. She was also fitted with 19 Bofors 40 mm guns in single mounts. All of the guns were mounted on the flight deck, not in sponsons on the side of the hull like her half-sisters that were completed as aircraft carriers. Each "pom-pom" mount was provided with a separate fire-control director fitted with a Type 262 gunnery radar.

Pioneer was ordered on 7 August 1942 under the name Ethalion, but was renamed Mars later in 1942. She was laid down at Vickers-Armstrong in Barrow-in-Furness on 2 December and was launched on 20 May 1944 The ship was renamed Pioneer in July 1944 after the decision had been made to convert her to an aircraft maintenance ship. and was completed on 8 February 1945.

Service
After working up, Pioneer sailed for Australia on 30 March 1945. She arrived in Sydney on 13 May and was transferred to Manus Island, in the Admiralty Islands, on 21 June to prepare for operations off Japan. She was still there when Japan surrendered on 15 August and had repaired 24 aircraft since her arrival. Pioneer arrived in Hong Kong in late September to help with the rebuilding of the colony's infrastructure. Her sailors restored power, telephone service and repaired trains and buses. She made one trip back to Manus, but was back in Hong Kong in late November. The ship sailed for Sydney the following month and departed for the UK on 17 February 1946. Upon her arrival, she was placed in reserve. Pioneer was sold to Thos. W. Ward for scrap in September 1954 and broken up in Inverkeithing.

See also
List of aircraft maintenance carriers of the Royal Navy

Notes

References

External links
 Maritimequest HMS Pioneer photo gallery

 

Colossus-class aircraft carriers
Ships built in Barrow-in-Furness
1944 ships
World War II aircraft carriers of the United Kingdom
Cold War aircraft carriers of the United Kingdom